The Virgin Queen is a 2005 BBC and Power co-production, four-part miniseries based upon the life of Queen Elizabeth I, starring Anne-Marie Duff and Tom Hardy as Robert Dudley, 1st Earl of Leicester.

Plot
From her time as a young princess in her early twenties to her death in 1603, The Virgin Queen explores both the public and private life of Queen Elizabeth I (Anne-Marie Duff). The series focuses on the internal motivation behind 25-year-old Elizabeth's vow of chastity upon her ascension to the throne. As a child, she confides in her friend Robert Dudley, 1st Earl of Leicester (Tom Hardy), that she wishes to never marry. Her relationship with Dudley, who would later become master of the Queen's horses, spans the four-part series and calls into question the ambiguous nature of their relations. The series features a scene where a dreaming Elizabeth fantasizes about making love to Dudley. When his wife Amy (Emilia Fox) dies under suspicious circumstances, Dudley proposes to the Queen and is rejected. Upon his death, Elizabeth's affections turn to Dudley's step-son Robert Devereux, 2nd Earl of Essex. However, when he is caught making plans for a coup, she has him executed.

As queen, Elizabeth is meticulous in constructing her public image. Scrutinizing every detail, she micro-manages everything from her appearance to her attitude. Alternately chaste and flirtatious, she nevertheless eschews love in favour of England. History and politics are intertwined throughout the series, from England's defeat of the Spanish Armada to the change from a Catholic to a Protestant nation, Elizabeth uses her power and her court to maintain her will.

Production
Co-Produced by the BBC and Power television for £9 million, The Virgin Queen was filmed at Pinewood Studios in summer 2005. Originally intended to air on BBC One in September 2005, the date would have coincided with the release of the Channel 4 two-part miniseries Elizabeth I (starring Helen Mirren). Due to the conflict, the BBC decided to delay the UK release until after the US opening in November 2005 on PBS's Masterpiece Theatre,.

Despite being a biopic of Elizabeth's life and reign, the series presented its main character with particular interest in several themes, most notably the emotional impact of her mother's execution and her love for Robert Dudley, 1st Earl of Leicester (Tom Hardy). Writer Paula Milne said of the series, "As my research started to reveal her unravelling, tumultuous relationship with Dudley, I knew I had found the spine of the story. Smart political and psychological interpretations of her life might give the drama contemporary gravitas, but its real power would lie in its emotional truth. Losing love, for whatever reason, reaches out through the centuries to all of us who have found love and lost it."

Summary

Episode 1
The first episode depicts Elizabeth from her imprisonment in the Tower of London by the Queen, her sister Mary I, accused with plotting the Queen's demise, to her accession to the throne following Mary's death, and her coronation. Elizabeth was imprisoned in the Tower, accused of participating in Thomas Wyatt's rebellion to overthrow Mary. The episode strongly hints Elizabeth's participation, though evidence of this remains highly conjectural. The episode also establishes Elizabeth's relationship with Robert Dudley, and they are shown to be greatly in love, despite Dudley being married to Amy Robsart, whom he met at the Stanfield Hall, they were married when both were 18 years old. Elizabeth's frustration at her later house arrest at Woodstock Manor is emphasised to somewhat comic effect. She is shown being held at Woodstock from her release from the Tower until her sister's death from cancer, when in reality she was only held there a year, before being recalled to London so Mary could keep a closer eye on her. The episode also depicts the legend of Elizabeth being told she is Queen of England under an oak tree, depicted as being in Woodstock but which in reality is claimed to have occurred at Hatfield House, and her utterance of the quote "This is the work of the Lord, and it is marvellous in our eyes..."

Episode 2
The second episode shows Elizabeth from several months to a year after her coronation, establishing herself as Queen, to the emergence of Mary, Queen of Scots, as her political rival. The episode makes much of her clandestine romance with Robert Dudley, and her resistance to marriage. Elizabeth is shown to be struggling with the adjustment to being Queen, especially in regard to Dudley. A scene shows Elizabeth dreaming of making love with Dudley, but the plot of the series follows the opinion that she resisted these urges, and remained a virgin. The episode introduces or further establishes several key characters in the story of Elizabeth's reign, including William Cecil; Amy Robsart; Francis Walsingham; Katherine Ashley; Thomas Howard, Duke of Norfolk (Elizabeth's cousin); and Lettice Knollys. The episode also shows Robert at his house with his wife, Amy, her health is in a poor condition, asking her husband to stay with her, but Robert replies that he must attend the court. also, the episode depicts Elizabeth's courtship from Philip II of Spain (her sister's widower) and the Archduke Charles of Austria. It also shows Elizabeth's early dealings with her cousin Mary, Queen of Scots, including her plans for her to marry Dudley, as a means to secure a political union between England and Scotland, and the treason of Thomas Howard. The closing scene depicts the start of the relationship between Robert Dudley and Lettice Knollys. Midway through the episode, Elizabeth's contraction of smallpox is dramatically depicted, the death of Dudley's wife, Amy Robsart, who waited and longed for Robert, the episode shows her taking her own life, to help achieving her husband's ambitions to marry Elizabeth.

Episode 3
The third episode begins with Elizabeth's courtship with Francis, Duke of Anjou, and ends just following the destruction of the Spanish Armada. During her near death from smallpox in the previous episode, Elizabeth is shown wearing the ornate red wig or hairpiece she has become famous for. The episode depicts Elizabeth's courtship of Anjou as nothing more than politics, and a wish for an heir, and suggests that she harboured little real affection for him, though like many of her courtships, this remains ambiguous. The key point of character drama in this episode is Elizabeth's discovery of Robert Dudley's marriage to Lettice Knollys, in that scene, Dudley echoed the phraseology from his dead wife, Amy's earlier letter, he says, "I mortgaged my life in the hope that someday we'd be together. I have stood by and watched while others fall at your feet. flattering you vanity." upon which she is shown flying into a grief-fuelled rage. The illness Dudley suffered prior to his death is also depicted from fairly early on, though Elizabeth remains ignorant of his affliction. Great focus is also placed on Elizabeth's turmoil over the situation with Mary, Queen of Scots, who is executed towards the end of the episode, an act which Elizabeth is shown expressing great remorse in private. The impending invasion of the Spanish Armada is dealt with fairly rapidly, the primary scene concerning the Armada being Elizabeth's encampment at Tilbury, where she gives an invigorating speech. These scenes are intercut, and immediately followed with her grief and heartbreak over the death of Robert Dudley, and her brief seclusion during the celebrations over the Armada's defeat. The episode ends with her first encounter with Robert Devereux. The ending makes much of the theory that Devereux was actually the son of Robert Dudley by Lettice Knollys, instead of the result of her first marriage to Walter Devereux.

Episode 4
This episode shows Elizabeth in the twilight of her reign. Anne Marie Duff and Sienna Guillory are given ageing makeup in this episode, accentuating their age in comparison to the previous episodes, marking them as enduring 'relics' of the past. The episode revolves mainly around Elizabeth's relationship with Robert Devereux as her court favourite, and the machinations for his advancement by his mother Lettice Knollys, the Queen's former handmaiden. The enmity between Elizabeth and Lettice is also emphasised, and the plot deviates from established history by showing that Elizabeth eventually did meet with Lettice before her death, albeit briefly and without exchanging words.  Devereux is held as a pawn between the two women, his love for Elizabeth on one side, his devotion to his mother on the other, the pressure of which causes him great turmoil, bordering on mental instability, culminating in his attempt at rebellion towards the end of the episode.
One haunting scene in the episode shows Devereux walking in on a half-dressed Elizabeth, and his shock when he sees the Queen as decrepit and old, without her wig or make up.  Elizabeth is the one remaining relic of the England she once knew, most of her friends and trusted advisors having been replaced by the next generation. The emphasis on Devereux takes away somewhat from the political problems Elizabeth was facing at the time, such as with Spain, France and Ireland, as well as significant problems in England itself with high taxes and the failure of the crops, though these events are made frequent reference to. The episode concludes with Robert Devereux's execution and Elizabeth's demise, including her encroaching senility and dementia with age, and her depression over Devereux's death. In these scenes, she is shown delivering her famous Golden Speech to Parliament. Her death is depicted in a more dramatic fashion than in reality, with her refusing to lie down in fear that she would not stand again. Elizabeth is also reminiscing of her life; walking through a crowd of people when her father was on the throne with someone saying "bastard", being informed that her sister Mary is dead, her beloved friend and chief-lady of the bedchamber Kat Ashley smiling at her, William Cecil, her one true love Robert Dudley smiling at her and her fateful exclamation of "I will have one mistress here, and no master! Do you hear me?!"
Finally, she is drawn from her reminiscing when she apparently suffers a stroke and collapses, with her advisers, courtiers and ladies-in-waiting rushing to assist as she dies. The episode ends with William Cecil's son, Robert, preparing for the accession of Elizabeth's successor, James I. He is seen discovering that Elizabeth added a clasp to the ring worn by the sovereign; opening it, he discovers that a portrait has been hidden. The episode ends with Robert speaking "It is the whore Anne Boleyn; her mother."

Historical accuracy
Described by its producers as "... [a] regal portrait ... steeped in historical accuracy", the series followed the general flow of history, but deviated from historical truth in numerous ways, such as:
In the film, Elizabeth meets with Lettice Knollys after a long estrangement. In fact, Elizabeth snubbed Lettice, although Essex arranged the meeting.
Elizabeth died standing up in the movie. In reality, she was persuaded to lie on a pile of cushions, then later to proceed to her bed, where she died.
 In the film Cardinal Pole is seen leading the redundant Catholics from court following Mary I's death. Pole actually died only hours after Mary and had been bedridden for days.
 The film portrays Elizabeth receiving news of the death of her sister from the Lord Chancellor Stephen Gardiner while she was being held at Woodstock in the custody of Sir Henry Bedingfeld. In fact, Gardiner predeceased Mary by three years, and Elizabeth was informed of her accession while living at Hatfield House, where she had built up a base of loyal followers.
 In the film Amy was shown taking her own life, in fact, Amy's death is ambiguous.

Cast and credits

Cast

Production credits
Producer – Paul Rutman
Director – Coky Giedroyc
Writer – Paula Milne
Composer – Martin Phipps
Director of Photography – David Odd
Production Designer – Donal Wood
Film Editor – Joe Walker
Make Up Supervisor – Karen Hartley
Costume Designer – Amy Roberts
Casting Director – Nina Gold
Executive Producers – Justin Bode, Laura Mackie, Kate Harwood, Simon Curtis

Filming locations
 Alnwick Castle (Execution scenes)
 Baddesley Clinton, Warwickshire (Cumnor Place)
 Bamburgh Castle, Northumberland (Tilbury)
 Chastleton House (Whitehall Palace interiors and gardens)
 Chillingham Castle (Fotheringhay Castle)
Labyrinthine Keep at Warkworth Castle (Tower of London)
London's Middle Temple (Receiving Chamber)
 Lord Leycester hospital (the Strand)
 New College, Oxford (Anointment room)
 Raby Castle (Whitehall Palace)
 Broughton Castle (Woodstock Manor)

Release

Home media 
The Virgin Queen was released on DVD in 2006 by PBS and is also available digitally on Amazon Prime Video and iTunes.

The series was also released on DVD in Germany and England. The DVD releases were heavily censored and the 4 episodes were recut to 2 episodes. The 240 minutes (4 hours) of the original TV broadcasts were cut to 200 minutes (3 hours and 20 minutes) in the DVD versions.

The digital releases that are available in Europe on Amazon Prime Video and iTunes are also ca. 40 minutes shorter, are censored and recut to 2 episodes.

Soundtrack

The original score was composed by Martin Phipps and features vocals by the Mediæval Bæbes and the London Bulgarian Choir. The score won an Ivor Novello Award for "Best Television soundtrack" on 24 May 2007. The lyrics on the track played during the opening sequence were derived from a poem written by Elizabeth I.

Track listing

See also
 Historical drama film
 BBC television drama
 BBC
 PBS

References

 C16th makeups: The Virgin Queen

External links
 
 

2006 British television series debuts
2006 British television series endings
2000s British drama television series
2000s British television miniseries
BBC television dramas
BBC television royalty dramas
Television set in Tudor England
Cultural depictions of Elizabeth I
English-language television shows
Television shows set in England